"Snake Charmer" is a song by UK bhangra artist Panjabi MC and the first track to be lifted from his 2008 album Indian Timing. It was released as a single in the UK in May 2009.

Track listing
Digital download
 "Snake Charmer" (Radio Edit) – 3:16
 "Snake Charmer" (DS1 Bass Line Mix) – 4:26
 "Snake Charmer" (Day Dreamers Dance Mix) – 4:02
 "Snake Charmer" (Instrumental Mix) – 3:15

Music video
The video of the song was released to specialist bhangra and Asian websites and TV stations up to 5 months before the release of the digital single.

Chart performance
In the UK, the song reached the top 10 of the now defunct Asian Network Chart, as compiled by the BBC Asian Network, and had received heavy airplay rotation as part of the album release and prior to being released as a digital single.

Release history

References

2008 songs
2009 singles
Panjabi MC songs